David K. Overstreet (born January 14, 1966) is a justice of the Illinois Supreme Court.

Education 

Overstreet received his Bachelor of Science from Lipscomb University and his Juris Doctor from the University of Tennessee College of Law.

Legal career 

Overstreet started his legal career with Miller, Tracy, Braun & Wilson of Monticello, Illinois from 1991–1992. He then practiced with the Law Office of Peter G. Angelos of Knoxville, Tennessee, from 1992 to 1995, and with Mitchell, Neubauer, Shaw & Hanson, P.C., Neubauer,
Hanson & Overstreet, P.C., and Neubauer & Overstreet, P.C. of Mount Vernon, Illinois, from 1995–2007.

Judicial career 

Overstreet was assigned to the 5th District Appellate Court of Illinois in 2017 and elected in 2018. Matthew Hartrich, the State's Attorney of Crawford County, was appointed to succeed Overstreet after the latter's elevation to the Appellate Court.

Illinois Supreme Court 

Overstreet faced off against Republican primary challenger John B. Barberis Jr.

On November 3, 2020, he went on to win the general election against his challenger Democratic candidate and Appellate Justice Judy Cates. He was sworn in on December 2, 2020.

After Overstreet's election to the Illinois Supreme Court, Milton S. Wharton, a retired judge, was appointed to the vacancy on the appellate court.

Personal life 

He is married to his wife Suzanne and they have three children.

References

External links 

Biography on the Illinois Courts website

1966 births
Living people
20th-century American lawyers
21st-century American judges
21st-century American lawyers
Illinois lawyers
Illinois state court judges
Illinois Republicans
Justices of the Illinois Supreme Court
Lipscomb University alumni
People from Mount Vernon, Illinois
Tennessee lawyers
University of Tennessee College of Law alumni